Dekh Bhai Dekh ) is an Indian Hindi sitcom which premiered on DD Metro on 6 May 1993. It was created, developed, edited, directed by Anand Mahendroo and produced by Jaya Bachchan under the banner of Saraswati Audio Visuals Pvt Ltd. It starred Shekhar Suman, Navin Nischol, Farida Jalal, Bhavana Balsavar, Deven Bhojani, Sushma Seth, N K Shivpuri, Vishal Singh, and Nattasha Singh.

Plot 
The story revolves around three generations of the Diwan family, who live as an extended family in an ancestral bungalow in the suburbs of Mumbai. The show takes the family through relationship troubles, business problems, irksome parents, and in-laws.

Cast
Sushma Seth as Sarla Diwan 
 N.K. Shivpuri as Durgadas Diwan
Navin Nischol as Balraj Diwan 
Shekhar Suman as Sameer Diwan 
Farida Jalal as Suhasini Diwan 
Bhavna Balsavar as Sunita Diwan
Vishal Singh as Sanjay Diwan
Nattasha Singh as Kirti Diwan
 Arrhan Singh as Vishal Diwan
 Karishma Acharya as Aabha Diwan
 Amar Upadhyay as Sahil Diwan
 Deven Bhojani as Kareema 
 Urvashi Dholakia as Shilpa
 Rakesh Thareja as Dingoo
 Satish Shah as M.K. Rai / Madan
 Divya Seth as Priya 
 Benu Kalsi as Badi Nani 
 Shammi as Choti Nani 
 Daisy Irani as Daisy Mausi
 Rakhee Tandon as Shivani
 Mona Ambegaonkar as Neeru
 Ananya Khare as Zubeida / Leena
Lilliput as Various characters
 Alyy Khan as Vikram, Vishal's detective friend
 Mushtaq Merchant as Various characters
 Anant Mahadevan as L.M. Narayan
 Deepika Amin episode38 as Richa, Rohit's (Keerti's London returned friend) girlfriend

References

External links

Hindi comedy shows
Indian comedy television series
DD Metro original programming
Indian television sitcoms
1993 Indian television series debuts
1997 Indian television series endings